Gītarāmāyaṇam (2011), literally The Rāmāyaṇa in songs, is a Sanskrit epic poem (Mahākāvya) of the Gītakāvya (lyrical poetry) genre, composed by Jagadguru Rambhadracharya (1950–) in the years 2009 and 2010. It consists of 1008 songs in Sanskrit which are divided into seven Kāṇḍas (books), every Kāṇḍa being sub-divided into one or more Sargas (cantos). There are 28 cantos in all, and each canto consists of 36 songs. The songs of the epic are based on rhythms and tunes or Rāgas found in the folk music and classical music of India. In the epic, each song in sung by one or more characters of the Rāmāyaṇa or by the poet. The songs progressively narrate the Rāmāyaṇa via monologues, dialogues and multilogues. There are occasional Sanskrit verses between the songs, which take the narrative forward.

A copy of the epic with a Hindi commentary by the poet was published by the Jagadguru Rambhadracharya Handicapped University, Chitrakuta, Uttar Pradesh. The book was released by the Sanskrit poet Abhirāja Rājendra Miśra at Chitarkuta on the Makara Saṅkrānti day of January 14, 2011.

Structure

The work begins with four verses in the Maṅgalācaraṇa. The poet invokes the blessings of Rāma in the first two verses, and Hanumān in the third verse. In the final verse, the work Gītarāmāyaṇam is introduced.

Bālakāṇḍam

Canto I. Stutasītārāmacandraḥ (Sanskrit: स्तुतसीतारामचन्द्रः), literally the canto with Sītā and Rāma eulogized.

Canto II. Gītarāghavāvirbhāvaḥ (Sanskrit: गीतराघवाविर्भावः), literally the canto with the songs of Rāma's manifestation. 

Canto III. Gītarāghavaśiśukeliḥ (Sanskrit: गीतराघवशिशुकेलिः), literally the canto with the songs of infant Rāma's pastimes. 

Canto IV. Gītarāghavabālalīlaḥ (Sanskrit: गीतराघवबाललीलः), literally the canto with the songs of child Rāma's play. 

Canto V. Gītasītāvirbhāvaḥ (Sanskrit: गीतसीताविर्भावः), literally the canto with the songs of Sītā's manifestation.

Canto VI. Gītayugalakaiśorakaḥ (Sanskrit: गीतयुगलकैशोरकः), literally the canto with the songs of the youthful duo. 

Canto VII. Gītasītāsvayaṃvaropakramaḥ  (Sanskrit: गीतसीतास्वयंवरोपक्रमः), literally the canto with the songs of the commencement of Sītā's Svayaṃvara.

Canto VIII. Gītasītānīketakaḥ (Sanskrit: गीतसीतानिकेतकः), literally the canto with the songs of Sītā's consort.

Canto IX. Gītasītāsvayaṃvaraḥ (Sanskrit: गीतसीतास्वयंवरः), literally the canto with the songs of Sītā's Svayaṃvara.

Canto X. Gītasītārāmapariṇayaḥ (Sanskrit: गीतसीतारामपरिणयः), literally the canto with the songs of the Sītā's marriage with Rāma.

Canto XI. Gītasītārāmapratyudgamotsavaḥ (Sanskrit: गीतसीतारामप्रत्युद्गमोत्सवः), literally the canto with the songs of the festivities at the return of Sītā and Rāma''.

Ayodhyākāṇḍam

Canto XII. Śrīsītārāmavanavihāraḥ

Canto XIII. Śrīsītārāmaholīvihāraḥ

Canto XIV. Śrīsītārāmadolotsavaḥ

Canto XV. Gītaṣaḍṛtuvarṇanaḥ

Canto XVI. Gītarāṣṭradaivataḥ

Canto XVII. Gītarāghavavanavāsaḥ

Canto XVIII. Gītapathikābhīṣṭhaḥ

Canto XIX. Gītāyodhyakavirahālambanaḥ

Canto XX. Gītacitrakūṭamaṇḍanaḥ

Araṇyakāṇḍam

Canto XXI. Gītalalitanaralīlaḥ

Kiṣkindhākāṇḍam

Canto XXII. Gītamārutijayaḥ

Sundarakāṇḍam

Canto XXIII. Gītahanumatparākramaḥ

Canto XXIV. Gītaśaraṇāgatavatsalaḥ

Yuddhakāṇḍam

Canto XXV. Gītaraṇakarkaśaḥ

Canto XXVI. Gītarāvaṇāriḥ

Uttarakāṇḍam

Canto XXVII. Gītapaṭṭābhiṣekaḥ

Canto XXVIII. Gītarājādhirājaḥ

Example song

In the following song (1.4.6), the child Rāma asks Kausalyā why the moon appears dark.

Notes

References
 

Epic poems in Sanskrit
Sanskrit literature
Sanskrit poetry
Works by Rambhadracharya